Piz Salteras is a mountain of the Albula Alps, located between Tinizong and Preda in the canton of Graubünden.

References

External links
 Piz Salteras on Hikr

Mountains of the Alps
Mountains of Graubünden
Mountains of Switzerland
Bergün Filisur
Surses